Indiana University Auditorium (IU Auditorium), is a 3,200-seat performing arts venue located at Indiana University in Bloomington, Indiana. It is situated in IU's Fine Arts Plaza alongside the Lilly Library and the Eskenazi School of Art, Architecture + Design.

Construction on IU Auditorium began in 1939 as a part of the Federal Works Agency Projects. It officially opened its doors March 22, 1941.

Today, IU Auditorium presents Broadway touring acts, popular musical artists, comedians, classical musicians and more. Over the years, it has hosted many notable artists, including Frank Zappa, James Taylor, Rush, Chicago, John Mellencamp, LL Cool J and The Go-Go's.

References

External links
 Official website

Indiana University Bloomington
Performing arts venues in Indiana